Darya Klimina (née Usanova, born 6 September 1989) is a Kazakhstani biathlete. She competed at the Biathlon World Championships 2012 and at the Biathlon World Championships 2013. She competed at the 2014 Winter Olympics in Sochi and the 2018 Winter Olympics in South Korea.

References

External links

1989 births
Living people
Biathletes at the 2014 Winter Olympics
Biathletes at the 2018 Winter Olympics
Kazakhstani female biathletes
Olympic biathletes of Kazakhstan
Asian Games medalists in biathlon
Biathletes at the 2017 Asian Winter Games
Medalists at the 2017 Asian Winter Games
Asian Games gold medalists for Kazakhstan
Asian Games bronze medalists for Kazakhstan
21st-century Kazakhstani women